Bikram may refer to

People
 Bikram Choudhury (born 1944), founder of Bikram Yoga
 Bikram Grewal, Indian ornithologist
 Bikram Keshari Deo (1952–2009), Indian politician
 Bikram Singh (musician) (born 1980), bhangra musician and lawyer
 Bikram Singh Majithia, Indian politician

Other uses
 Bikram, Patna, a town in India
 Bikram Yoga, a form of "hot yoga"